Hyalopsocus is a genus of common barklice in the family Psocidae. There are about six described species in Hyalopsocus.

Species
These six species belong to the genus Hyalopsocus:
 Hyalopsocus contrarius (Reuter, 1893)
 Hyalopsocus deltoides Li, 2002
 Hyalopsocus floridanus (Banks, 1905)
 Hyalopsocus gardinii (Lienhard, 1983)
 Hyalopsocus morio (Latreille, 1794)
 Hyalopsocus striatus (Walker, 1853)

References

External links

 

Psocidae
Articles created by Qbugbot